Otto Johannes Brendel (October 10, 1901 in Erlangen, Germany – October 8, 1973 in New York City) was a German art historian and scholar of Etruscan art and archaeology.

Biography 
In 1928, he received his Ph.D. from the Ruprecht Karl University of Heidelberg under Ludwig Curtius on the topic of Roman iconography of the Augustan period.  While at Heidelberg, Brendel studied with many notable scholars, including Franz Boll, E. Wayne Craven, Alfred von Domaszewski, Friedrich Karl von Duhn, Richard Carl Meister, Eugen Täubler, the literary theorist Ernst Robert Curtius, Friedrich Gundolf, Karl Jaspers, and the classical art historians Karl Lehmann and Friedrich Zimmer.  He emigrated to the United States in 1938.

In the United States, he taught at Washington University in St. Louis from 1938 to 1941 and Indiana University from 1941 to 1956.  From 1949 to 1951, Brendel was at the American Academy in Rome, first under a Prix de Rome and then with a Fulbright Fellowship.  In 1956, he became Professor of Art History and Archaeology at Columbia University, and became emeritus in 1963, continuing to teach until his retirement in June 1973.  He died that September. At the time of his death he had written the manuscript for the Pelican History of Art volume on Etruscan Art. It was completed posthumously by Emeline Hill Richardson, and published in 1978. His work Prolegomena to the Study of Roman Art represents a notable scholarly approach to the historiography of Roman art. Otto's wife Maria arranged to have many of his unfinished works published after his death.

One of Brendel's students was Larissa Bonfante.  Brendel married Maria Weigert Brendel (1902-1994) in 1929. Brendel's daughter Cornelia Brendel Foss was married to American composer Lukas Foss.

Bibliography
 
 "Prolegomena to the Study of Roman Art." Memoirs of the American Academy in Rome 21 (1953): 7-73, revised and reprinted separately as Prolegomena to the Study of Roman Art. New Haven, CT: Yale University Press, 1979.
 Etruscan Art. Pelican History of Art 43.  New York: Penguin Books, 1978, 2nd ed, New Haven:  Yale University Press, 1995. .
 The Visible Idea: Interpretations of Classical Art. Washington, DC:  Decatur House, 1980.
 Ikonographie des Kaisers Augustus.  1931.
 "Symbolik der Kugel." Mitteilungen des Deutschen Archaeologischen Instituts, Roemische Abteilung 51 (1936): 1-95, reprinted as Symbolism of the Sphere: a Contribution to the History of Earlier Greek philosophy.  Leiden: Brill, 1977.
 "Classicism in Roman architecture." Journal of the Society of Architectural Historians 29 (October 1970): 264.
 "Borrowings from ancient art in Titian." Art Bulletin 37 (June 1955): 113-25.

Further reading
 Calder, William M., III. "Biographical Note." In Memoriam Otto J. Brendel: Essays in Archaeology and the Humanities. Edited by Larissa Bonfante and Helga von Heintze. Mainz: Verlag Philipp von Zabern, 1976, x-xi. [complete bibliography,] xii-xiv.
 Kleinbauer, W. Eugene.  Modern Perspectives in Western Art History:  An Anthology of 20th-Century Writings on the Visual Arts.  New York:  Holt, Rinehart and Winston, 1971, p. 81.
 Archäologenbildnisse: Porträts und Kurzbiographien von Klassichen Archäologen deutscher Sprache. Reinhard Lullies, ed. Mainz am Rhein: Verlag Philipp von Zabern, 1988: 283-284.
 Calder, William.  "Brendel, Otto J."  Encyclopedia of the History of Classical Archaeology.  Nancy Thomson de Grummond, ed.   Westport, CT:  Greenwood Press, 1996, vol. 1, pp. 190–91.
 Obermayer, Hans Peter. "He is pure Aryan" – Otto Brendel. In Obermayer. Deutsche Altertumswissenschaftler im amerikanischen Exil. Eine Rekonstruktion. Berlin, Boston: De Gruyter, 2014: 192–220.

References

External links
 Otto Brendel papers, 1940s-1970. Held by the Department of Drawings & Archives, Avery Architectural & Fine Arts Library, Columbia University.

American archaeologists
American art historians
Archaeologists from Bavaria
German art historians
Linguists of Etruscan
Washington University in St. Louis faculty
Indiana University faculty
Columbia University faculty
Heidelberg University alumni
1901 births
1973 deaths
20th-century American historians
20th-century American male writers
German male non-fiction writers
German emigrants to the United States
American male non-fiction writers